Yelahanka Junction railway station (station code: YNK) is an Indian Railways station in the outskirts of Bangalore in the Indian state of Karnataka, located in Yelahanka locality  about 25 km away from the . This station is located on the Guntakal–Bangalore line.

Junction
Yelahanka  railway station is a junction on the Guntakal–Bangalore section, Bangalore–Kolar line, and one line connecting to Bangalore City line–Chennai Central via .

See also 
Bengaluru Commuter Rail

References

Railway stations in Bangalore
Railway junction stations in Karnataka